This list is a collection of players that have represented the Italy national rugby league team since 2008, when the team's governing body, Federazione Italiana Rugby League, was founded. Only matches played under RLIF laws are included.

Notes

References 

 
Italy